Sophia Kalkau (born 1960) is a Danish artist, who works in a variety of media including writing, photography, sculpture and installation. Sophia Kalkau has studied Art History at Copenhagen University and holds a degree in Art Theory from the Royal Danish Academy of Fine Arts. She is the author of numerous publications on aesthetics.

Works 
In the center of Kalkau's art stands a critical, open dialogue that researches vocabularies of material and form around the female body through a photographic work. In a repetitive act of merging, binding and combining human figures and geometrical objects Kalkau formulates an artistic narrative of surface continuity and spatial organization.

A key characteristic of her oeuvre is a conceptual approach to contemporary sculpture that she serially explores through her own body.  Kalkau's interest in physical, cognitive and perceptive transitions materializes frequently in a scenographic performative gesture that she records through serial photographic prints. Kalkau's photographic work defies an unambiguous reading and invites the viewer to various interpretations.

Art in public space in selection  
 2021           "Fra himlen fra havet – Portaler til poesi", Forensic department of Mental Health Centre Sct. Hans, Roskilde. 
 2016           "Marmorstelen", Grøndalskirken, Copenhagen.
2016           "Det Ægyptiske Æg", Den Frie Centre of Contemporary Art, Copenhagen.
2015           "Another Way of Watching", Slotsvase. Palsgaard Slot, Juelsminde, Denmark.
 2013-2015 "Cirklen, Kurven, Bladet". The New University Hospital, Skejby, Denmark.
 2012           "Black Column". Pier project Søndergaard, Ballerup, Denmark.
 2011           "Atrium". Hospice Djursland, Rønde, Denmark.
 2010/2011   "Lenticula". The historic site of Skibelund Krat, Denmark.
 2005           "Quadrature of the Moon". The Royal Danish Academy Architecture Library. Copenhagen, Denmark.
 2003           "Black Lines". Vejleåparken, Ishøj, Denmark.

Public collection in selection  
 SMK - National Gallery of Denmark
 New Carlsberg Foundation
 Kunsten – Museum of Modern Art Aalborg
Arken Denmark
Horsens Kunstmuseum
 Museet for Fotokunst  
 AROS Aarhus Kunstmuseum   
 Vejlemuseerne  
 Vejen Kunstmuseum  
 KØS – Museum of Art in Public Spaces

Books and Publications 

 2022 "UNG SOM BLY | CIRKELBRYDER"
 2019 "STOFFET OG ÆGGET", Kunsten - Museum of Modern Art, Aalborg.
 2017 "LINE OF CIRCLES", Author Ursula Andkjær Olsen and Helle Brøns, Sorø Kunstmuseum, Denmark.
  2014 "SOLEN ER HVID" author Ursula Andkjær Olsen.
 2011 "Sophia Kalkau - efter ægget : en konstellation af værker fra 1999 til i dag". Author Ursula Andkjær Olsen, Editor and Author Claus Hagedorn-Olsen. Horsens Kunstmuseum, Denmark. 
 2010 "Sophia Kalkau : Tæt på, langt ude = Close up, far out". Author: Mikkel Bogh, Camilla Jalving and Flemming Friborg. Kalkaus Forlag.
 2009 “PART OF THE MILL”, Maison du Danemark, Paris.
 2008 "Dog and Die", Sophia Kalkau, publisher Brandt, Odense.
 2007 FRA HEXA TIL VASEN, New Carlsberg Glyptotek.
 2002 Hun og jeg og dyrene : prosastykker. Author Sophia Kalkau. Publisher Borgen.
 2000 Månespil, Author Sophia Kalkau, Publisher Borgen.

References 

 http://www.smk.dk/en/explore-the-art/search-smk/ - Sophia Kalkau
 Louisiana Channel, Sophia Kalkau Interview: Bubbles of Humour. Louisiana Museum of Modern Art.
 

Living people
Danish sculptors
Danish contemporary artists
1960 births
Danish women artists
20th-century Danish artists
21st-century Danish artists
20th-century Danish women artists
21st-century Danish women artists
Royal Danish Academy of Fine Arts alumni
University of Copenhagen alumni
20th-century sculptors
21st-century sculptors